The 2006–07 season was the 130th season in the club's history, their 84th in the English Football League and first back in League One, the third tier of English football following their relegation from the Championship in the previous season. They finished 13th in League One on 60 points. They also competed in the FA Cup, Football League Cup and the Football League Trophy, where they were eliminated in the first round, third round and area final respectively.

Players

Left club during season

Competitions

Football League One

League table

Matches

FA Cup

Football League Cup

Football League Trophy

Notes

References

Crewe Alexandra F.C. seasons
Crewe Alexandra